Nicolas Tourte (born 18 August 1979) is a former professional tennis player from France.

Biography
Born in Chambéry, Tourte was a right-handed player, with a double handed backhand.

Tourte, who won three Challenger doubles titles, made the singles final of the Grenoble Challenger tournament in 2006, during which he had wins over Ernests Gulbis and Gilles Müller.

He featured in the main draw of one Grand Slam event, the 2007 French Open. Playing in the men's doubles, Tourte and partner Thomas Oger made the second round, where they lost to the eventual champions, Mark Knowles and Daniel Nestor.

In 2008 he played doubles in two tournaments on the ATP Tour, the Swedish Open and Dutch Open, with Alessandro Motti and Igor Zelenay respectively.

Challenger titles

Doubles: (3)

References

External links
 
 

1979 births
Living people
French male tennis players
Sportspeople from Chambéry